The 2022 NAIA football season is the component of the 2022 college football season organized by the National Association of Intercollegiate Athletics (NAIA) in the United States.

The regular season began on August 25 and culminated on November 12.

The playoffs, known as the NAIA Football National Championship, will begin on November 19 and culminate with the championship game on December 17 at Durham County Memorial Stadium in Durham, North Carolina.

Conference changes and new programs
Appalachian Athletic Conference and Sun Conference started to sponsor football this season.

Membership changes

Conference standings

Postseason

Bracket

Rankings

See also
 2022 NCAA Division I FBS football season
 2022 NCAA Division I FCS football season
 2022 NCAA Division II football season
 2022 NCAA Division III football season

References